The men's 60 kilograms (Extra lightweight) judo competition at the 2010 Asian Games in Guangzhou was held on 16 November at the Huagong Gymnasium.

Schedule
All times are China Standard Time (UTC+08:00)

Results

Main bracket

Final

Top half

Bottom half

Repechage

References
Results

External links
Draw

M60
Judo at the Asian Games Men's Extra Lightweight